The Fly II is a 1989 American science fiction horror film directed by Chris Walas. The film stars Eric Stoltz and Daphne Zuniga, and is a sequel to the 1986 film The Fly, itself a remake of the 1958 film of the same name. Stoltz's character in this sequel is the adult son of Veronica Quaife and Seth Brundle, a scientist who became a human-fly hybrid as a result of an experiment gone awry, played by Jeff Goldblum in the 1986 remake. With the exception of stock footage of Goldblum from the first film, John Getz was the only actor to reprise his role, with another actress filling the Geena Davis role as Quaife in the opening birth scene. Unlike the previous film, this film received negative reviews.

Plot 

Several months after the events of The Fly, Veronica Quaife gives birth to a larval sac and dies. The sac splits open to reveal a seemingly normal baby boy. Anton Bartok, the owner of the company that financed Seth Brundle's original teleportation experiments, adopts the child and names him Martin. Martin grows up in a clinical environment, tested and examined by Dr. Jainway and Dr. Shepard, two scientists under Bartok's employ. Martin's physical and mental maturity is highly accelerated, and he possesses a genius-level intellect, incredible reflexes, and no need for sleep. He knows he is aging faster than a normal human, but is unaware of the true cause, having been told his father died from the same rapid aging disease.

At age three, Martin has the physique of a 10-year-old and frequently sneaks around to explore the Bartok complex. He finds a room containing laboratory animals and befriends a dog. The next night, he brings it food, but finds it missing. He enters an observation booth overlooking Bay 17. There, scientists have reassembled Brundle's Telepods, but have been unable to duplicate the programming that enabled them to teleport living subjects.  An attempt to teleport the dog fails, leaving it horribly deformed. It maims one of the scientists, horrifying young Martin. Two years later, Martin's body has matured to that of a 25-year-old young man. On his fifth birthday, Bartok presents Martin with a bungalow on the Bartok facility's property. He also offers Martin a job: to repair his father's Telepods. He apologizes about the dog and assures Martin that its suffering was brief. When Martin is uneasy about the proposition, Bartok shows him Veronica Quaife's videotapes, which documented Seth Brundle's progress with the Telepods. Seeing his father describe how the Telepods ostensibly improved and energized his body, Martin accepts Bartok's proposal.

As he works on the Telepods, Martin befriends an employee, Beth Logan. Beth invites Martin to a party at the specimens division, where he learns that the mutated dog is still kept alive and studied. Thinking Beth is aware of the dog's imprisonment, Martin argues with her, leaves the party, and goes to the animal's holding pen. The deformed dog, in terrible pain, still remembers Martin (recognizing him despite his growth), and he tearfully euthanizes it with chloroform. Martin reconciles with Beth and arrives at his father's "eureka" moment when he realizes the Telepods' computer need to be creative to analyze living flesh. Martin shows Beth his perfected Telepods by teleporting a kitten without harm. They become lovers, but Martin shows signs of his eventual mutation into a human-fly hybrid. Martin devises a potential cure for his condition, which involves swapping out his mutated genes for healthy human genes. Martin shelves this idea when he realizes the other person would be subject to a grotesque genetic disfigurement.

Eventually, Martin learns that Bartok has hidden cameras in his bungalow. Martin breaks into Bartok's records room, where he learns of his father's true fate. Bartok confronts Martin and explains that he is aware of and has been waiting for his inevitable mutation. Bartok reveals his plan to use Martin's body and the Telepods' potential for genetic manipulation for profit. Martin's insect genes fully awaken and his transformation into a human-insect hybrid begins, and he escapes from Bartok Industries. Bartok is unable to use the Telepods, as they are locked by a password. Martin also installed a computer virus which will erase the Telepods' programming if the wrong password is entered. Bartok orders a search for Martin.

Martin goes to Beth and explains the situation, and the two flee. They visit Veronica Quaife's old confidant, Stathis Borans (implied to have been told that Brundle's baby died in childbirth along with Veronica), who informs Martin that Seth Brundle died after trying to drag Veronica into the Telepod with him, and Veronica killed Seth with a shotgun. Stathis
confirms for Martin that the Telepods are his only chance for a cure, and he gives Beth and Martin his vehicle to aid their escape. Martin and Beth keep running, but Martin's physical and emotional changes become too much for Beth to handle, and she eventually surrenders them both to Bartok. Without revealing the password, Martin becomes enveloped in a cocoon. Bartok interrogates Beth for the password. 

Shortly after, the fully-transformed Martin emerges from his cocoon and rampages through the Bartok facility, killing several members of Bartok's scientific staff (including Shepard and Jainway) as well as Bartok's security personnel. Martin breaks into Bay 17 and kills Scorby, Bartok's chief of security. Martin grabs Bartok, forces him to type in the computer password, "Dad", and drags Bartok and himself into a Telepod. Martin gestures to Beth to activate the gene-swapping sequence, and Beth complies. When he and Bartok emerge, Martin is restored to a fully human form, while Bartok is revealed to have been transformed into a deformed monstrosity. Bartok ends up kept in the same enclosure as the mutated dog; as he begins to eat swill from the dog’s dish, Bartok catches sight of a single housefly sitting on the dish’s edge.

Cast 

In addition, Saffron Henderson briefly appears as Veronica Quaife, the role played by Geena Davis in the original film while archive footage of Jeff Goldblum, uncredited, shows him in the Seth Brundle role from the original film.

Production 

Geena Davis, who played Veronica Quaife in the first film, was replaced by Saffron Henderson for the sequel, as Davis refused to reprise her role due to her character's death in the first act disallowing the opportunity for character development. Keanu Reeves was offered the role of Brundle but turned it down as he disliked the script. Josh Brolin was passed after a failed audition for the role. The Fly II is an early entry in the filmography of Frank Darabont, who co-wrote the screenplay. Tom Sullivan worked as a sculptor for the film's visual effects.

Release

Home media 
The film was released on VHS by 20th Century Fox Home Entertainment, and in 2000, the film was released on DVD as a double feature with The Fly. The film received a standalone DVD release on October 5, 2004. In March 2017, Australian distribution company Via Vision Entertainment released a five-disc, region-free box set containing the original 1958 The Fly, its sequels Return of the Fly and Curse of the Fly, the 1986 version of The Fly, and The Fly II on Blu-ray.

Reception

Box office 
The Fly II grossed $20,021,322 at the US box office and a further $18,881,857 abroad, resulting in a worldwide total of $38,903,179.

Critical response 
On Metacritic, which assigns a normalized rating to reviews, the film has a weighted average score of 36 out of 100, based on 15 critics, indicating "generally unfavorable reviews".

Janet Maslin from The New York Times gave the film a negative review, writing, "The only respect in which it matches Mr. Cronenberg's Fly is in its sheer repulsiveness, since this film degenerates into a series of slime-ridden, glop-oozing special effects in its final half hour." Richard Harrington from The Washington Post offered the film similar criticism, calling the film's script "flat", and criticized the film's special effects as being "clumsy". Author and film critic Leonard Maltin awarded the film his lowest rating, calling the film "Alternately dull and messy but mostly dull". David Hughes from Empire Magazine awarded the film 3/5 stars, writing, "Whilst this fly is not as tightly scripted or keenly directed as its parent, it does have pace, breathless tension and the sort of gross-out effects that rules out kebabs for some time after the credits have rolled." Ryan Lambie of Den of Geek wrote that while the film "wasn't particularly clever, ... as an exercise in pure, claret-stained entertainment, it deserves far more credit than it frequently receives".

Other media

Comic books 
Beginning in March 2015, IDW Publishing released a five-issue comic book miniseries titled The Fly: Outbreak, written by Brandon Seifert.

References

External links 

 
 
 
 

1989 films
1989 horror films
1980s monster movies
1980s science fiction horror films
American monster movies
American science fiction horror films
American science fiction thriller films
American sequel films
American body horror films
Brooksfilms films
1980s English-language films
Films scored by Christopher Young
Films about orphans
Films about shapeshifting
Films produced by Mel Brooks
Films produced by Steven-Charles Jaffe
Films shot in British Columbia
American pregnancy films
Films about genetic engineering
Teleportation in films
20th Century Fox films
Films with screenplays by Frank Darabont
Films with screenplays by Mick Garris
The Fly (franchise)
Films directed by Chris Walas
1989 directorial debut films
Mad scientist films
1980s American films